In combinatorial mathematics, Toida's conjecture, due to Shunichi Toida in 1977, is a refinement of the disproven Ádám's conjecture from 1967.

Statement
Both conjectures concern circulant graphs. These are graphs defined from a positive integer  and a set  of positive integers.
whenever their difference modulo  belongs to set . Every symmetry of the cyclic group of addition modulo 
gives rise to a symmetry of the -vertex circulant graphs, and Ádám conjectured (incorrectly) that these are the only symmetries of the circulant graphs.

Proofs

The conjecture was proven in the special case where n is a prime power by Klin and Poschel in 1978, and by Golfand, Najmark, and Poschel in 1984.

The conjecture was then fully proven by Muzychuk, Klin, and Poschel in 2001 by using Schur algebra, and simultaneously by Dobson and Morris in 2002 by using the classification of finite simple groups.

Notes

Combinatorics
Conjectures that have been proved